V-set domains are Ig-like domains resembling the antibody variable domain. V-set domains are found in diverse protein families, including immunoglobulin light and heavy chains; in several T-cell receptors such as CD2 (Cluster of Differentiation 2), CD4, CD80, and CD86; in myelin membrane adhesion molecules; in junctional adhesion molecules (JAM); in tyrosine-protein kinase receptors; and in the programmed cell death protein 1 (PD1).

Subfamilies
Immunoglobulin V-set, subgroup 
T-cell surface antigen CD2

Human proteins containing this domain 
ACAM;      ACAN;      ADAMTSL1;  AGC1;      AMICA1;    BCAM;      BCAN;      BGP;
BGPc;      BT3.3;     BTN1A1;    BTN2A1;    BTN2A2;    BTN2A3;    BTN3A1;    BTN3A2;
BTN3A3;    BTNL2;     BTNL3;     BTNL8;     BTNL9;     C10orf54;  C1orf32;   C9orf94;
CADM1;     CADM2;     CADM3;     CADM4;     CD2;       CD226;     CD274;     CD276;
CD300A;    CD300C;    CD300D;    CD300E;    CD300LB;   CD300LF;   CD300LG;   CD33;
CD3G;      CD7;       CD79A;     CD79B;     CD80;      CD83;      CD86;      CD8A;
CD8B;      CD8B1;     CD96;      CEACAM1;   CEACAM16;  CEACAM19;  CEACAM21;  CEACAM3;
CEACAM4;   CEACAM5;   CEACAM6;   CEACAM7;   CEACAM8;   CHL1;      CREA7-4;   CRTAM;
CSF1R;     CTLA4;     CXADR;     ERMAP;     ESAM;      F11R;      FCAMR;     FCRL2;
FKSG87;    GLUDP5;    GPA33;     HAPLN1;    HAPLN2;    HAPLN3;    HAPLN4;    HAVCR1;
HEPACAM;   HHLA2;     HSPG2;     ICOSLG;    IGHA1;     IGHA2;     IGHD;      IGHG1;
IGHG3;     IGHM;      IGHV1-69;  IGHV4-31;  IGHV7-81;  IGKC;      IGKV1-5;   IGKV2-24;
IGL@;      IGLC1;     IGLV2-14;  IGLV3-21;  IGLV3-25;  IGLV4-3;   IGLV5-52;  IGLV6-57;
IGSF11;    IGSF2;     IGSF3;     IGSF6;     IGSF8;     IGSF9;     IL18R1;    IREM2;
IREM3;     JAM2;      JAM3;      KDR;       KIRREL;    KIRREL2;   KIRREL3;   LAG3;
LOC253012; LOC402482; MAG;       MGC33530;  MOG;       MPZ;       MPZL1;     MPZL2;
MXRA8;     MYBPC3;    NCA;       NCR2;      NCR3;      NPHS1;     OBSL1;     OPCML;
P0;        PDCD1;     PIGR;      PILRA;     PILRB;     PRODH2;    PSG1;      PSG10;
PSG11;     PSG11s';   PSG2;      PSG3;      PSG4;      PSG5;      PSG6;      PSG7;
PSG8;      PSG9;      PTGFRN;    PTPN1L;    PVR;       PVRL1;     PVRL2;     PVRL3;
PVRL4;     SCN2B;     SCN3B;     SCN4B;     SEMA3D;    SIGLEC1;   SIGLEC10;  SIGLEC11;
SIGLEC12;  SIGLEC14;  SIGLEC15;  SIGLEC6;   SIGLEC7;   SIGLEC8;   SIGLEC9;   SIRPA;
SIRPB1;    SIRPD;     SIRPG;     SISP1;     SLAMF6;    SLAMF7;    TAPBPL;    TCRA;
TCRB;      TIMD4;     TRA@;      TRAV20;    TRBC1;     TRBV19;    TRBV3-1;   TRBV5-4;
TRBV7-2;   TRDV2;     TREM1;     TREM2;     TREML1;    TREML2;    TREML4;    TRGV3;
TRGV5;     TRGV7;     TRGV9;     VCAM1;     VCAN;      VPREB1;    VPREB3;    VSIG1;
VSIG2;     VSIG4;     VSIG9;     VSIG10;    VSTM1;     VSTM2;     VTCN1;

References

Protein domains
Single-pass transmembrane proteins